Aziz Hamid Madni (Urdu: عزیز حامد مدنی), (15 June  1922 – 23 April 1991) was a notable Pakistani poet and writer. He was born in Raipur, British India.

Poetry collection
He was notable for the following poetry collections:
Jadeed Urdu Shaeri
Dasht-i-Imkan
Chashm-i-Nigran
Nakhl-i- Guman

References 

1922 births
1991 deaths
Urdu-language poets from Pakistan
Urdu-language writers from Pakistan
People from Raipur district
Muhajir people
Pakistani poets